Odd Stray (born 18 February 1969) is a Norwegian sailor. He competed in the Tornado event at the 1992 Summer Olympics.

References

External links
 

1969 births
Living people
Norwegian male sailors (sport)
Olympic sailors of Norway
Sailors at the 1992 Summer Olympics – Tornado
People from Mandal, Norway
Sportspeople from Agder